Hye-bin is a Korean feminine given name. Its meanings depends on the hanja used to write each syllable of the name.

Hanja and meaning
There are 16 hanja with the reading "hye" and 25 hanja with the reading "bin" on the South Korean government's official list of hanja which may be used in given names. Some ways of writing this name in hanja include:

: "intelligent and refined"

Historically, Hye-bin was a title for concubines of the first rank during the Joseon dynasty, for example King Sejong the Great's concubine  or King Injong's concubine Hye-bin Jeong. Such titles can be distinguished from the given name because they are placed before the surname rather than after it.

People
People with this name include:
Jeon Hye-bin (born 1983), South Korean actress and singer
Kim Hye-bin (born 1984), South Korean martial artist, women's sanda bronze medalist in wushu at the 2014 Asian Games

Fictional characters
Fictional characters with this name include:
Jang Hye-bin, from the 2011 South Korean television series A Thousand Kisses

See also
List of Korean given names
Korean name

References

Korean feminine given names